Abner Hazeltine (June 10, 1793 – December 20, 1879) was a politician from New York. 

Born in Wardsboro, Vermont, Hazeltine attended the common schools.  He graduated from Williams College, Williamstown, Massachusetts, in 1815.  He moved to Jamestown, New York, November 2, 1815, where he taught school and was a founder of the Jamestown Academy.  He studied law with Jacob Houghton and Samuel A. Brown, was admitted to the bar in 1819 and commenced practice in Chautauqua County, New York.  He moved to Warren, Pennsylvania, and was the first lawyer in the county.  He returned to Jamestown, New York, and resumed the practice of law in 1823.  He also became editorial writer on the Jamestown Journal 1826-1829.  He served as member of the New York State Assembly in 1829 and 1830.

Hazeltine was elected as an Anti-Masonic candidate to the Twenty-third Congress and reelected as an Anti-Jacksonian to the Twenty-fourth Congress (March 4, 1833 – March 3, 1837).  He was not a candidate for renomination in 1836.  He served as district attorney of Chautauqua County 1847-1850, and as judge of Chautauqua County 1859-1863.  He was appointed special county judge of Chautauqua County in 1873 but did not qualify because he was older than the maximum allowable age of 70.

Hazeltine served as United States Commissioner for the courts of the Northern District of New York from 1873 until his death.  He died in Jamestown, New York, on December 20, 1879.  He was interred in Jamestown's Lakeview Cemetery.

References

1793 births
1879 deaths
People from Wardsboro, Vermont
Anti-Masonic Party members of the United States House of Representatives from New York (state)
19th-century American politicians
New York (state) National Republicans
National Republican Party members of the United States House of Representatives
Members of the New York State Assembly
Politicians from Jamestown, New York
County district attorneys in New York (state)
New York (state) state court judges
New York (state) lawyers
Williams College alumni
Burials in New York (state)
19th-century American judges
19th-century American lawyers